Sydowiella is a genus of fungi within the family Sydowiellaceae.

The genus was circumscribed by Franz Petrak in Ann. Mycol. vol.21 on page 30 in 1923.

The genus name of Sydowiella is in honour of Hans Sydow (1879–1946), who was a German mycologist.

Species
As accepted by Species Fungorum;
Sydowiella azukiae 
Sydowiella centaureae 
Sydowiella dakotensis 
Sydowiella depressula 
Sydowiella fenestrans 
Sydowiella indica 
Sydowiella juncina 
Sydowiella stellatifolii 
Sydowiella urticicola 

Former species;
 S. borealis  = Cainiella borealis, Sordariaceae
 S. dryadis {{Au|Lar.N. Vassiljeva (1979), (= Lentomita dryadis]], Chaetosphaeriaceae
 S. dryadis var. macrospora  = Lentomita dryadis', Chaetosphaeriaceae

References

External links
Sydowiella at Index Fungorum

Diaporthales